Italy competed at the 1993 Summer Universiade in Buffalo, United States of America and won 25 medals.

Medals

Details

References

External links
 Universiade (World University Games)
 WORLD STUDENT GAMES (UNIVERSIADE - MEN)
 WORLD STUDENT GAMES (UNIVERSIADE - WOMEN)

1993
1993 in Italian sport
Italy